Berlin, the capital of Nazi Germany, was subject to 363 air raids during the Second World War. It was bombed by the RAF Bomber Command between 1940 and 1945, the United States Army Air Forces' Eighth Air Force between 1943 and 1945, and the French Air Force in 1940 and between 1944 and 1945/as part of the Allied campaign of strategic bombing of Germany. It was also attacked by aircraft of the Red Air Force in 1941 and particularly in 1945, as Soviet forces closed on the city. British bombers dropped 45,517 tons of bombs, while American aircraft dropped 22,090.3 tons. As the bombings continued, more and more people fled the city. By May 1945, 1.7 million people (40% of the population) had fled.

Prelude
When the Second World War began in 1939, US President Franklin D. Roosevelt issued a request to the major belligerents to confine their air raids to military targets. The French and the British agreed to abide by the request "upon the understanding that these same rules of warfare will be scrupulously observed by all of their opponents".

The British had a policy of using aerial bombing only against military targets and or infrastructure such as ports and railways of direct military importance. It was acknowledged that the aerial bombing of Germany would cause civilian casualties, but the British government renounced the deliberate bombing of civilian property outside combat zones as a military tactic. The policy was abandoned on 15 May 1940, two days after the German air attack on Rotterdam, when the Royal Air Force was given permission to attack targets in the Ruhr, including oil plants and other civilian industrial targets that aided the German war effort, such as blast furnaces that at night were self-illuminating. The first RAF raid on the interior of Germany took place on the night of 10 – 11 May (on Dortmund). The Jules Verne, a variant of the Farman F.220 of the French Naval Aviation, was the first Allied bomber to raid Berlin. On the night of 7 June 1940, it dropped eight bombs of 250 kg and eighty of 10 kg on the German capital.

Between 1939 and 1942, the policy of bombing only targets of direct military significance was gradually abandoned in favour of "area bombing", the large-scale bombing of German cities to destroy housing and civilian infrastructure. Although killing German civilians was never an explicit policy, it was obvious that area bombing would cause large-scale civilian casualties. With the technology available at the time, the precision bombing of military targets was possible only by daylight, and it was difficult even then. Daylight bombing raids conducted by Bomber Command involved unacceptably-high losses of British aircraft, and bombing by night led to far lower British losses but was of necessity indiscriminate because of the difficulties of nocturnal navigation and bomb aiming.

1940 to 1943

It could be bombed only at night in summer when the days were longer and skies clear—which increased the risk to Allied bombers. The first RAF raid on Berlin took place on the night of 25 August 1940; 95 aircraft were dispatched to bomb Tempelhof Airport near the center of Berlin and Siemensstadt, of which 81 dropped their bombs in and around Berlin, and while the damage was slight, the psychological effect on Hitler was greater. The bombing raids on Berlin prompted Hitler to order the shift of the Luftwaffe's target from British airfields and air defenses to British cities, at a time during the Battle of Britain when the British air defenses were becoming exhausted and overstretched.

In the following two weeks there were a further five raids of a similar size, all nominally precision raids at specific targets, but with the difficulties of navigating at night the bombs that were dropped were widely dispersed. During 1940 there were more raids on Berlin, all of which did little damage. The raids grew more frequent in 1941, but were ineffective in hitting important targets. The head of the Air Staff of the RAF, Sir Charles Portal, justified these raids by saying that to "get four million people out of bed and into the shelters" was worth the losses involved.

Medium Navy bombers, accompanied from 12 August by Army bombers, conducted ten raids from Saaremaa island to Berlin with 3–12 aircraft in each raid, fifty in total reaching Berlin. Heavy Army bombers, operating from near Leningrad, executed one raid to Berlin on 11 August, with only few machines reaching the target. In total in 1941, Soviet aircraft dropped  of bombs on Berlin. Combat and operational losses for the Soviets tallied 17 aircraft destroyed and 70 crewmen killed.

On 7 November 1941, Sir Richard Peirse, head of RAF Bomber Command, launched a large raid on Berlin, sending over 160 bombers to the capital. 21 were shot down or crashed, and again little damage was done due to bad weather. This failure led to the dismissal of Peirse and his replacement (in February 1942) by Sir Arthur Travers Harris, who believed in both the efficacy and necessity of area bombing. Harris said: "The Nazis entered this war under the rather childish delusion that they were going to bomb everyone else, and nobody was going to bomb them. At Rotterdam, London, Warsaw, and half a hundred other places, they put their rather naïve theory into operation. They sowed the wind, and now they are going to reap the whirlwind."At the same time, new bombers with longer ranges were coming into service, particularly the Avro Lancaster, which became available in large numbers during 1942. During most of 1942, however, Bomber Command's priority was attacking Germany's U-boat ports as part of Britain's effort to win the Battle of the Atlantic. During the whole of 1942 there were only nine air alerts in Berlin, none of them serious. Only in 1943 did Harris have both the means and the opportunity to put his belief in area bombing into practice.

The Battle of Berlin

The Battle of Berlin was launched by Harris in November 1943, a concerted air campaign against the German capital, although other cities continued to be attacked to prevent the Germans concentrating their defences in Berlin. Harris believed this could be the blow that would break German resistance. "It will cost us between 400 and 500 aircraft," he said. "It will cost Germany the war." By this time he could deploy over 800 long-range bombers on any given night, equipped with new and more sophisticated navigational devices such as H2S radar. Between November 1943 and March 1944, Bomber Command made 16 massed attacks on Berlin.

A prelude to the 1943 raids came from the De Havilland Mosquito, which hit the capital on January 30, 1943, the tenth anniversary of the Nazis' Machtergreifung. That same day, both Göring and Goebbels were known to be giving big speeches that were to be broadcast live by radio. At precisely 11.00 am, Mosquitoes of No. 105 Squadron arrived over Berlin exactly on time to disrupt Göring's speech. Later that day, No. 139 Squadron repeated the trick for Goebbels. These were great propaganda raids which—much as the Doolittle Raid on the Japanese home islands had done for boosting American morale in April 1942—were a severe embarrassment for the German leadership. April 20, 1943 was Hitler's 54th birthday. Bomber Command decided that they had to mark the occasion with a raid on Berlin, and it was decided that the Mosquito was the right aircraft for the job. Accordingly, No. 105 Squadron was dispatched to the German capital, successfully reaching the city with the loss of only one aircraft.

The first raid of the battle occurred on November 18–19, 1943. Berlin was the main target, and was attacked by 440 Avro Lancasters aided by four Mosquitos. The city was under cloud and the damage was not severe. The second major raid was on the night of November 22–23, 1943. This was the most effective raid by the RAF on Berlin. The raid caused extensive damage to the residential areas west of the centre, Tiergarten and Charlottenburg, Schöneberg and Spandau. Because of the dry weather conditions, several firestorms ignited. The Kaiser Wilhelm Memorial Church was destroyed. Several other buildings of note were either damaged or destroyed, including the British, French, Italian and Japanese embassies, Charlottenburg Palace and Berlin Zoo, as were the Ministry of Munitions, the Waffen SS Administrative College, the barracks of the Imperial Guard at Spandau and several arms factories.

On December 17, extensive damage was done to the Berlin railway system. By this time cumulative effect of the bombing campaign had made more than a quarter of Berlin's total living accommodation unusable. There was another major raid on January 28–29, 1944, when Berlin's western and southern districts were hit in the most concentrated attack of this period. On February 15–16, important war industries were hit, including the large Siemensstadt area, with the centre and south-western districts sustaining most of the damage. This was the largest raid by the RAF on Berlin. Raids continued until March 1944.Campaign Diary January 1944

These raids caused immense devastation and loss of life in Berlin. The November 22, 1943 raid killed 2,000 Berliners and rendered 175,000 homeless. The following night, 1,000 were killed and 100,000 made homeless. During December and January regular raids killed hundreds of people each night and rendered between 20,000 and 80,000 homeless each time. Overall nearly 4,000 were killed, 10,000 injured and 450,000 made homeless.

The 16 raids on Berlin cost Bomber Command more than 500 aircraft, with their crews killed or captured. This was a loss rate of 5.8%, which was above the 5% threshold that was considered the maximum sustainable operational loss rate by the RAF. In December 1943, for example, 11 crews from No. 460 Squadron RAAF alone were lost in operations against Berlin; and in January and February, another 14 crews were killed. Having 25 aircraft destroyed meant that the fighting force of the squadron had to be replaced in three months. At these rates Bomber Command would have been wiped out before Berlin." It has been largely acknowledged that the Battle of Berlin was a failure; for the RAF, British official historians have stated that "in an operational sense the Battle of Berlin was more than a failure, it was a defeat". 

March 1944 to April 1945

In 1943, the U.S. Army and the Standard Oil company built a set of replicas in western Utah, of typical German working class housing estates, "German Village", which would be of key importance in acquiring the know-how and experience necessary to carry out the firebombings on Berlin. It was done with the assistance of Erich Mendelsohn, a Jewish architect of structures in Berlin who fled the Nazis in 1933.

The Big Week (Sunday, 20–Friday, 25 February 1944) heavy bomber offensive began shortly after the Eighth Air Force commander, Maj. Gen. Jimmy Doolittle, had implemented a major change in fighter defense of USAAF strategic bomber formations that had bolstered the confidence of U.S. strategic bombing crews. Until that time, Allied bombers avoided contact with the Luftwaffe; now, the Americans used any method that would force the Luftwaffe into combat. Implementing this policy, the United States looked toward Berlin. Raiding the German capital, the USAAF reasoned, would force the Luftwaffe into battle. Consequently, on 4 March, the USSTAF launched the first of several attacks against Berlin. Fierce battles raged and resulted in heavy losses for both sides; 69 B-17s were lost on 6 March but the Luftwaffe lost 160 aircraft. The Allies replaced their losses; the Luftwaffe could not.

At the tail end of the Battle of Berlin the RAF made one last large raid on the city on the night of 24–25 March, losing 8.9% of the attacking force, but due to the failure of the Battle of Berlin, and the switch to the tactical bombing of France during the summer months in support of the Allied invasion of France, RAF Bomber Command left Berlin alone for most of 1944. Nevertheless, regular nuisance raids by both the RAF and USAAF continued, including the Operation Whitebait diversion for the bombing of the Peenemünde Army Research Center. In 1945, the Eighth Air Force launched a number of very large daytime raids on Berlin, the last of them being on 18 March (there were bombing raids to Falkensee and Spandau, near Berlin, on 28 March), the 15th Air Force launched its only bombing mission to Berlin on 24 March, and for 36 nights in succession scores of RAF Mosquitos bombed the German capital, ending on the night of 20/21 April 1945 just before the Soviets entered the city.

The largest American raid on Berlin
1,500 bombers of the Eighth Air Force, protected by some 1,000 fighters attacked the Berlin railway system on the forenoon (British : morning) of 3 February 1945 in the belief that the German Sixth Panzer Army was moving through Berlin by train on its way to the Eastern Front, thinking the Sixth Panzer Army would use the Tempelhof railyards for the move. This was one of the few occasions on which the USAAF undertook a mass attack on a city centre. Lt-General James Doolittle, commander of the USAAF Eighth Air Force, objected to this tactic, but he was overruled by the USAAF commander, General Carl Spaatz, who was supported by the Allied commander General Dwight D. Eisenhower. Eisenhower and Spaatz made it clear that the attack on Berlin was of great political importance in that it was designed to assist the Soviet offensive on the Oder east of Berlin, and was essential for Allied unity.Beevor, p. 74. claims 3,000

In the raid, led by Lieutenant-Colonel Robert Rosenthal of the 100th Bombardment Group flying in a pathfinder B-17G, s/n 44-8379 — commanding the entire First Air Division's bomber force on this raid — Friedrichstadt (the newspaper district), and Luisenstadt (both divided between the boroughs of Kreuzberg and Mitte, the central area) and some other areas, such as Friedrichshain, were severely damaged. The bombs used in this raid consisted mostly of high explosive ordnance and not incendiary munitions. The area that suffered the greatest damage did not include railway main lines, which were more northern (Stadtbahn) and southern (Ringbahn).

The bombing was so dense that it caused a city fire spreading eastwards, driven by the wind, over the south of Friedrichstadt and the northwest of neighboured Luisenstadt. The fire lasted for four days until it had burnt everything combustible in its range to ashes and after it had reached waterways, large thoroughfares, and parks that the fire could not jump over. Due to the exhaustion of German supplies the German anti-aircraft defense was under-equipped and weak so that out of the 1,600 US aircraft committed, only 36 were shot down and their crews taken as prisoners-of-war. First Air Division commander Lt. Col. Rosenthal was among those shot down and survived, but was rescued by the Soviet armed forces and eventually returned to England.

A number of monuments, such as French Luisenstadt Church, St. James Church, Jerusalem's Church, Luisenstadt Church, St. Michael's Church, St. Simeon Church, and the Marcher Protestant Consistory (today's entrance of Jewish Museum Berlin) as well as government and Nazi Party buildings were also hit, including the Reich Chancellery, the Party Chancellery, the Gestapo headquarters, and the People's Court. The Unter den Linden, Wilhelmstrasse and Friedrichstrasse areas were turned into seas of ruins. Among the dead was Roland Freisler, the infamous head justice of the People's Court. The death toll amounted to 2,894, fewer than might have been expected because the raid took place in daytime with relatively few incendiary bombs. The number of wounded amounted to 20,000, and 120,000 were left homeless or "dehoused".

Another raid on 26 February 1945 left another 80,000 people homeless. Raids continued until April, when the Red Army was outside the city. In the last days of the war the Red Air Force also bombed Berlin, as well as using Ilyushin Il-2 and similar aircraft for low-level attacks from 28 March onwards. By this time Berlin's civil defences and infrastructure were close to collapsing but civilian morale held. After the capture of Berlin, Soviet General Nikolai Bersarin said, referring to the Red Army's artillery and rocket bombardment, that:
"the Western Allies had dropped 65,000 tons of explosives on the city in the course of more than two years; whereas the Red Army had expended 40,000 tons in merely two weeks". Later, statisticians calculated that for every inhabitant of Berlin there were nearly 30 cubic meters (39 cubic yards) of rubble.

Up to the end of March 1945 there had been a total of 314 air raids on Berlin, with 85 of those coming in the last twelve months. Half of all houses were damaged and around a third uninhabitable, as much as 16 km² of the city was simply rubble. Estimates of the total number of dead in Berlin from air raids range from 20,000 to 50,000; current German studies suggest that a figure in the lower part of this range is more likely. This compares to death tolls of between 25,000 and 35,000 in the single attack on Dresden on 14 February 1945, and the 42,000 killed at Hamburg in a single raid in 1943, with both the Hamburg and Dresden raids combined having a lower casualty total than the 9/10 March 1945 Operation Meetinghouse single firebombing raid on Tokyo, devastating some  causing the loss of at least 100,000 lives in the Japanese capital.

Berlin's defences

The Nazi regime was well aware of the political necessity of protecting the Reich capital against devastation from the air. Even before the war, work had begun on an extensive system of public air raid shelters, but by 1939 only 15% of the planned 2,000 shelters had been built. By 1941, however, the five huge public shelters (Zoo, Anhalt Station, Humboldthain, Friedrichshain and Kleistpark) were complete, offering shelter to 65,000 people. Other shelters were built under government buildings, the best-known being the so-called Führerbunker under the Reich Chancellery building. In addition, many U-Bahn stations were converted into shelters. The rest of the population had to make do with their own cellars.

In 1943, the Germans decided to evacuate non-essential people from Berlin. By 1944 1.2 million people, 790,000 of them women and children, about a quarter of the city's population, had been evacuated to rural areas. An effort was made to evacuate all children from Berlin, but this was resisted by parents, and many evacuees soon made their way back to the city (as was also the case in London in 1940–41). The increasing shortage of manpower as the war dragged on meant that female labour was essential to keep Berlin's war industries going, so the evacuation of all women with children was not possible. At the end of 1944 the city's population began to grow again as refugees fleeing the Red Army's advance in the east began to pour into Berlin. The Ostvertriebenen ("refugees from the East") were officially denied permission to remain in Berlin for longer than two days and were housed in camps near the city before being moved on westwards; it is estimated less than 50,000 managed to remain in Berlin. By January 1945 the population was around 2.9 million, although the demands of the German military were such that only 100,000 of these were males aged 18–30. Another 100,000 or so were forced labor, mainly French Fremdarbeiter, "foreign workers", and Russian Ostarbeiter ("eastern workers"). The key to the Flak area were three huge Flak towers (Flaktürme), which provided enormously tough platforms for both searchlights and 128 mm anti-aircraft guns as well as shelters (Hochbunker) for civilians. These towers were at the Berlin Zoo in the Tiergarten, Humboldthain and Friedrichshain. The Flak guns were increasingly manned by the teenagers of the Hitler Youth as older men were drafted to the front. By 1945 the girls of the League of German Girls (BDM) were also operating Flak guns. After 1944 there was little fighter protection from the Luftwaffe, and the Flak defences were increasingly overwhelmed by the scale of the attacks.

Timeline

Notes

References

 
 
 
 
 
 
 
 
 
 
 Quester, George H. (1986). Deterrence before Hiroshima: the airpower background of modern strategy'', Transaction Publishers;  
 
 
 
 
 
 
 
 
 
 
 

Strategic operations of the Red Army in World War II
Berlin
Berlin
Firebombings
1940s in Berlin
Articles containing video clips